Rory Mario Trevor Sabbatini (born 2 April 1976) is a South African-Slovak professional golfer. Sabbatini won six times on the PGA Tour between 2000 and 2011 and was runner-up in the 2007 Masters. He spent 21 weeks in the world top-10 in late-2007 and early-2008, with a high of 8th. Sabbatini won the silver medal at the 2020 Summer Olympics, representing Slovakia.

Early life
Sabbatini was born in Durban, South Africa, and has Italian, Scottish and Irish ancestry. He started playing golf at age 4, but concentrated on it from age 12. He was recruited by the University of Arizona, turned professional in 1998 and joined the PGA Tour in 1999. He was the youngest member of the tour that year.

Professional career
During the first decade of the 2000s, Sabbatini had five PGA Tour wins; he finished 2006 placed 12th on the money list. In September 2007, he reached the top 10 of the world rankings for the first time, He spent 21 weeks in the top-10 between September 2007 and March 2008, with a high of 8th.

Sabbatini tied for second at the 2007 Masters Tournament and the 2007 WGC-Bridgestone Invitational. He won the Par 3 Contest at the 2008 Masters Tournament.

Sabbatini has represented South Africa in the World Cup six times and won the event with Trevor Immelman in 2003.

In his first Presidents Cup appearance in 2007, Sabbatini had a 0–3–1 record, as the International team was defeated by the United States team.

In May 2009 Sabbatini captured his fifth PGA Tour title by winning the HP Byron Nelson Championship by two strokes over Brian Davis. He broke the tournament record for scoring with a score of 269 (−19), beating the previous record of 270 (−18).

In March 2011 Sabbatini won his sixth PGA Tour Title at The Honda Classic with a one stroke victory over South Korea's Yang Yong-eun. Sabbatini entered the final round with a five stroke lead over the rest of the field, helped by a course record-equalling 64 on day two. He started his final round in solid fashion with an early birdie at the 3rd hole, however as the round progressed he made bogeys at the 9th and 14th, meaning that Yang was able to cut that lead to just one, with a spectacular tee shot on the par-three 15th that landed 18 inches past the pin. On the next hole though, Sabbatini holed a clutch birdie putt to tighten his grip on the title and played out the 17th and 18th in even-par to hold on for a one stroke victory. This win also secured him a place at the 2011 Masters Tournament.

On 15 December 2019, Sabbatini won the QBE Shootout with partner Kevin Tway.

Sabbatini qualified to represent Slovakia at the 2020 Summer Olympics and won the silver medal.

Controversy
In the final round of the 2005 Booz Allen Classic, apparently frustrated by the slow pace of play by his partner, Ben Crane, Sabbatini finished the 17th hole and walked over to the next tee, leaving Crane behind to complete the hole by himself. He received heavy criticism, and some sympathy, and later apologised for the incident.

Sabbatini also made waves following the Wachovia Championship in May 2007 when, after leading the field by one stroke after day three and then giving up five strokes to Tiger Woods to lose the tournament on Sunday, he proclaimed that Woods was "more beatable than ever." In the final round of the 2007 WGC-Bridgestone Invitational, he had a fan removed who heckled him with questions about Tiger Woods. Then, in December of the same year, more controversy was stirred when he withdrew from the Target World Challenge, an off-season event hosted by Tiger Woods, becoming the only player in history to withdraw from that event.

In 2011, Sabbatini created more controversy when at the Northern Trust Open, after hitting his ball in the rough, a volunteer helped to locate the ball, but Sabbatini, thinking that the volunteer had moved his ball, yelled at him. He later apologised to avoid being penalised. Later in 2011, at the Zurich Classic of New Orleans, Sabbatini got into a heated, profanity-laced argument with playing partner Sean O'Hair for undisclosed reasons. His penalty was also undisclosed because of the PGA Tour's policy.

Citizenship change
In December 2018, Sabbatini became a citizen of Slovakia, the home country of his wife and stepson. Sabbatini's wife's cousin is the vice president of the Slovak Golf Association. Initially, there was speculation that the move was made in order for Sabbatini to qualify for the 2020 Olympics, but he said it was to help grow the game in that country. The Olympics use the OWGR (Official World Golf Ranking) for qualification and the 201st-ranked Sabbatini would not have qualified for South Africa with ten others ahead of him. Sabbatini also has a UK passport and US citizenship.

Professional wins (8)

PGA Tour wins (6)

PGA Tour playoff record (1–1)

Other wins (2)

Results in major championships
Results not in chronological order in 2020.

CUT = missed the half-way cut
"T" = tied
NT = No tournament due to COVID-19 pandemic

Summary

Most consecutive cuts made – 4 (2019 U.S. Open – 2020 U.S. Open, current)
Longest streak of top-10s – 1

Results in The Players Championship

CUT = missed the halfway cut
"T" indicates a tie for a place
C = Cancelled after the first round due to the COVID-19 pandemic

Results in World Golf Championships

QF, R16, R32, R64 = Round in which player lost in match play
"T" = Tied
Note that the HSBC Champions did not become a WGC event until 2009.

Team appearances
Amateur
Palmer Cup (representing Great Britain & Ireland): 1998 (tie)

Professional
World Cup (representing South Africa): 2002, 2003 (winners), 2004, 2006, 2008, 2009
Presidents Cup (representing the International Team): 2007

See also
1998 PGA Tour Qualifying School graduates
2016 Web.com Tour Finals graduates

References

External links
 
 
 
 
 
 

South African male golfers
Slovak male golfers
PGA Tour golfers
Olympic golfers of Slovakia
Golfers at the 2020 Summer Olympics
Medalists at the 2020 Summer Olympics
Olympic medalists in golf
Olympic silver medalists for Slovakia
Arizona Wildcats men's golfers
Korn Ferry Tour graduates
Sportspeople from Durban
Sportspeople from Fort Worth, Texas
South African expatriates in the United States
South African people of British descent
South African people of Italian descent
South African people of Scottish descent
South African people of Irish descent
Slovak people of Irish descent
Slovak people of Italian descent
1976 births
Living people